The Worcester Kiltie Pipe Band is a Grade 2 pipe band from Worcester, Massachusetts. It is led by pipe major Davy Methven and lead drummer Colum Lundt. They compete in the United States, Canada and the UK and wear the Modern Scott tartan. They were the first band from the United States to rise to prominence in Grade 1, and in 1964 became the first US band to compete at the World Pipe Band Championships.

History

Origins
Formed in 1916, Worcester Kiltie is one of the oldest active pipe bands in the United States. The band was founded by Thomas Denholm, a Scottish immigrant to the Worcester area. Denholm was familiar with the Clan Scott organization, and they assisted the early band with fundraising and events. To this day, the band wears the Scott tartan.

The Golden Years
In 1956, the band decided to put ads in newspapers in Scotland in an attempt to recruit players to move to the United States. Among the first to respond was Scottish piper James Kerr, who immigrated to the country and became pipe major. He was joined by his cousin, Alex Colville, who took over as lead drummer. They led the band to three straight North American Championships between 1961 and 1963, a fourth in 1965 and another in 1971.

Under Kerr's leadership, the Kilties put themselves on the international piping map in 1969 by winning a significant contest in Scotland and besting the reigning world champions, the Glasgow Police Pipe Band at the Lesmahagow Games. They followed that by placing third at the World Championships a few seasons later.

James Kerr remained the pipe major until retiring in 1983, moving on to become a solo and band judge.

Revival
In the years following Kerr's retirement, the band found itself competing in Grade 4, three grades below the heyday of Grade 1.

In 2012, like Denholm and Kerr before him, Davy Methven came over from Scotland to revive the once famous American band as pipe major. Methven was a world champion with Shotts and Dykehead Caledonia Pipe Band and pipe major for the Clan Gregor Society Pipe Band, leading them to a Grade 2 Worlds title in 2003. Methven, along with lead drummer Colum Lundt, previously of Peel Regional Police Pipe Band, took the reins after Pipe Major Neil Gow retired, and began their plan to return the band to its former glory.

Shortly after Methven assumed the role of pipe major, a relative of Thomas Denholm's reached out to the band. She donated Denholm's original pipes to the band, a silver and ivory set of RG Lawries from the 1910s. After some needed restoration by Methven, they are once again in use by the band's pipe major after nearly a century.

Centennial and World Championship
2016 marked the hundredth anniversary for the band as they looked to continue their rise through the ranks. Now a Grade 3 band, Worcester had made two trips over to Scotland to compete at the World Championships. They finished eleventh in Grade 3A final in 2014, and failed to qualify for the final in 2015.

On their third attempt, they finished second in the qualifying round, and won the twelve-band final to be named Grade 3A World Champions on August 13.

Current Band
Currently the Kilties compete internationally in Grade 2, following an upgrade after the 2016 season. The band takes annual trips to at least one major contest per year.

Some recent results include:
3rd Place, 2018 UK Championships
5th Place, 2018 World Championships
2nd Place, 2019 North American Championships
6th Place, 2022 European Championships

Pipe Majors
 Thomas Denholm (1916-?)
 James Kerr (1956-1983)
 Dave Stark
 John Reid
 Bill McGinnes
 Jimmy Rankin
 Greg Morrow
 Bob Burnett
 George McKendrick
 Donald Ritchie
 Iain Massie
 John Sullivan
 Ryan Fabrycki
 Greg Markiewicz
 Neil Gow
 Davy Methven (2012–present)

References

Grade 1 pipe bands